Gopal Sharma  (born 3 August 1960) is a former Indian cricketer who played in 5 Tests and 11 ODIs from 1985 to 1990. He was an off-spinner but was overshadowed by the spinners of the day for a place in the international squad - Laxman Sivaramakrishnan, Maninder Singh, Arshad Ayub, Shivlal Yadav, Ravi Shastri and Narendra Hirwani.

He was the first person from Uttar Pradesh to represent India post-independence. He was a member of the India Selection Committee representing the Central Zone in 2004/05 season.

References

1960 births
Indian cricket administrators
India One Day International cricketers
India Test cricketers
Indian cricketers
Living people
Sportspeople from Kanpur
Cricketers from Uttar Pradesh
Uttar Pradesh cricketers
Central Zone cricketers
India national cricket team selectors